The 1975–76 season was Port Vale's 64th season of football in the Football League, and their sixth successive season (12th overall) in the Third Division. Manager Roy Sproson brought Mick Cullerton back to Vale Park, and Cullerton was to become the top-scorer for the season with 21 goals. However the ongoing success of rivals Stoke City in winning the League Cup, playing in Europe, and competing at the top of the First Division caused Vale's support to suffer. The loyal support of a few thousand fans was not enough to balance the books, and so Brian Horton was controversially sold to Brighton & Hove Albion for £30,000.

Overview

Third Division
The pre-season saw failed attempts by Roy Sproson to sign Wales internationals Mike England and Wyn Davies. Instead he bought back Mick Cullerton from Stafford Rangers for £4,000, who had scored over seventy goals for Rangers in his two seasons away from Burslem. Another former player, Ken Hancock, re-signed as a player-coach, however he soon found himself unable to play as he had received a pay-out upon his retirement in 1973. Just two days before the opening game Sproson quickly signed Terry Lees from Stoke City for £3,000 and Geoff Morris from Bangor City for £200.

The season opened with five draws, followed by two victories which took the Vale up to second. Six games without a win soon brought the "Valiants" tumbling down the table though, as Cullerton lost his scoring touch. At the end of October arrived Steve Taylor on loan from Bolton Wanderers, who put more 'bite' into the Vale attack. Home fans turned against the players, and coach Reg Berks was 'appalled by some of the abuse hurled at the players'. Taylor scored a brace past Sheffield Wednesday at Hillsborough on 8 November, only to return immediately back to Bolton. The team's poor disciplinary record continued from the previous campaigns, and The Football Association put the club 'under constant review' after Sproson arrived 45 minutes late to a disciplinary hearing in London after missing his train. Cullerton was back in scoring form as the Vale picked up victories and rose up the table. A season-low crowd of 2,789 on 20 December saw Vale come from 3–0 down to Grimsby Town to win the match 4–3. To motivate the players coach Reg Berks had told them at half-time that he was facing the sack if the team lost the game. The promotion-chasers pulled away from Vale in the New Year however. A rare event occurred on 17 January, when the Vale directors permitted rivals Stoke to play a home game to Middlesbrough at Vale Park. This happened because a severe gale severely damaged the Victoria Ground, whilst the gale also caused £2,000 worth of damage to Vale Park, the damage to Stoke's ground was much more severe. A crowd of 21,009 saw Stoke win 1–0, the highest crowd at Vale Park in over a decade. Vale's campaign carried on, though injuries built up Ray Williams managed to break a 21-game goal drought to earn a credible point at Cardiff City's Ninian Park on 25 February. Eight more points in the next four games took the club to within three points of the promotion zone. Yet in March the club sold Brian Horton to Brighton & Hove Albion for £30,000, a sum the club needed to balance the books. The club's form suffered immediately, and mid-table was the result. On 10 April, Brighton beat Vale 3–0 at the Withdean Stadium, and John Brodie broke his leg.

They finished in twelfth place with 46 points. Mick Cullerton hit 21 goals in all competitions to become the club's top scorer. To celebrate the club's centenary, a friendly was played with Stoke City, which finished 1–1 in front of 9,825 spectators. Stoke generously allowed the Vale to pocket the entire £6,500 worth of takings from the match.

Finances
On the financial side, the Horton transfer and donations of £19,965 from the Development Fund ensured a profit of £24,819. An increase in ticket prices offset the cost of a reduced average gate. An income of £2,775 was gained from renting out space to market traders, however Stoke-on-Trent Council soon put a stop to this. Geoff Morris left on a free transfer in the summer, signing with Kidderminster Harriers.

Cup competitions
In the FA Cup, Vale progressed past Southern League Grantham 4–1 in Burslem following a 2–2 draw away. This proved a lucky escape for Vale as Brownbill's equalizing goal at Grantham was allowed to stand despite an obvious handball. Many Vale supporters said that the linesman had raised his flag, only to lower it after being threatened by irate Vale spectators. In the Second Round they faced Fourth Division Huddersfield Town at Leeds Road, and were eliminated 2–1.

In the League Cup, the new two-legged format only resulted in a 4–4 aggregate draw, and so a replay was held at Gay Meadow, Shrewsbury, which Hereford won 1–0. Cullerton scored a hat-trick in the first leg, thereby making 'a fairytale come true' by hitting three in his first game back at Vale Park.

League table

Results
Port Vale's score comes first

Football League Third Division

Results by matchday

Matches

FA Cup

League Cup

Player statistics

Appearances

Top scorers

Transfers

Transfers in

Transfers out

Loans in

References
Specific

General

Port Vale F.C. seasons
Port Vale